Austin Steward (1793 – February 15, 1869) was an African-American abolitionist and author. He was born a slave in Virginia then moved at age 7 with the Helm household to New York State in 1800. The household settled in the town of Bath, New York in 1803. He escaped slavery at about age 21, settling in Rochester, New York, and then Canada. His autobiography, Twenty-Two Years a Slave, was published in 1857.

Life
Austin Steward was born in Prince William County, Virginia, in 1793 to Robert and Susan Steward. He had a sister, Mary. They were enslaved by planter Capt. William Helm. Steward was seven years old when he was assigned his first duties as a house servant to Helm. Steward taught himself to read in secrecy, but he was discovered and severely beaten.

Helm moved his family and the Stewards to New York in 1800. Although it was a free state, it had a gradual abolition approach and slavery was still permitted. After continued abuse when hired out to a brutal taskmaster, Steward determined to escape, which he did in 1814 at about age 21.

Steward made his way to Rochester, New York. Initially he worked for Darius Comstock, president of the Manumission Society, and took classes to increase his education. Before his escape, he had consulted about pursuing legal manumission but was discouraged that it would take too long. In 1817 he started what became a successful business in Rochester, opening his own meat market and general store. He gradually acquired considerable property. According to his autobiography, he gave a speech on July 5, 1827, the celebration of final emancipation of slaves in New York, and gained press coverage of the event.

In 1831, Steward went to Canada, devoting himself to aiding fugitive slaves. He was interested in a new settlement, the Wilberforce Colony (named in honor of William Wilberforce), located north of present-day London, Ontario. The Colony had been founded in 1829 by African-Americans fleeing the Ohio Black Codes, as well as rioting in Cincinnati. Almost immediately upon his arrival, Steward was named president of the Colony's board of managers. Wilberforce Colony struggled, however, with internal divisions and financial difficulties, and he eventually returned, nearly destitute, to Rochester in 1837.

His memoir, Twenty-Two Years a Slave, and Forty Years a Freeman, was published by William Alling in 1857. It is considered a slave narrative, detailing his early life of enslavement and escape, as well as his years of freedom and work at Wilberforce Colony. In the years before the American Civil War, such books sometimes became bestsellers in the North, and abolitionists drew from them in their arguments against the cruelties of slavery.

Steward died of typhoid fever on February 15, 1869, and was buried in Canandaigua, New York.

References

External links

 
 
 Twenty-Two Years a Slave, and Forty Years a Freeman; Embracing a Correspondence of Several Years. Rochester, N.Y.: William Alling, 1857; full text available online at Documenting the American South, University of North Carolina.
 Spartacus Educational profile of Austin Seward

1793 births
1869 deaths
African-American abolitionists
African-American writers
19th-century American writers
18th-century American slaves
People from Prince William County, Virginia
Writers from Rochester, New York
People from Canandaigua, New York
Deaths from typhoid fever
Infectious disease deaths in New York (state)
Activists from Rochester, New York
Burials in New York (state)
People who wrote slave narratives